José de Sousa Cintra, known professionally as Sousa Cintra, is a Portuguese businessman who served as president of sports club Sporting CP from 1989 to 1995.

Biography 
He was born in 1944 in the village and parish of Raposeira, Vila do Bispo Municipality, in the Algarve region. As a child he worked as a snail trader in his village, and at 15 years old he went to Lisbon where he obtained a job at Hotel Tivoli Lisboa as an elevator operator. While working there, he earned a larger amount of money selling watercolor paintings on the side. When 16 years old he joined the Portuguese Navy and served for four years. After the Carnation Revolution of 1974, Cintra saw a number of his assets expropriated but eventually acquired Águas Vidago, a mineral water company. Between 1989 and 1995, Sousa Cintra was the chairman of Sporting CP.

In 1998, he bought a beer factory in São Paulo and shortly after he built another in Rio de Janeiro, Brazil. His beer business in Brazil reached the break even point and was ranked number four in a short span of time. In 2001, he invested in a new beer factory in Santarém, Portugal in order to produce and sell Cintra beer in his home country. Due to the strong competition and the power of well-established beer brands in the Portuguese market (Super Bock and Sagres), Sousa Cintra sold out his Portuguese beer business in 2006, retaining only the successful Brazilian activities until 2007 when they were sold to AmBev.

References

Year of birth missing (living people)
Living people
Portuguese businesspeople
Portuguese football chairmen and investors
Sporting CP presidents